The deepsea skate (Bathyraja abyssicola) is a species of softnose skate, in the family Arhynchobatidae, found in deep water from 362 to 2,906 m, usually on the continental slope. They are distributed from off northern Baja California around Coronado Island and Cortes Bank, north to the Bering Sea, and west to Japan. There have also been sightings north of Darwin Island within the Galapagos Marine Reserve in 2015. This was the first record of the Deepsea Skate being found in the tropical eastern Pacific Ocean. It is fairly common below 1,000 m, and is taken as bycatch in deepwater trawls and traps. The species name abyssicola comes from the Greek abyssos meaning "bottomless", and cola meaning "living at depths".

The pectoral fin disc of the deepsea skate has a moderately triangular anterior margin, a broadly rounded posterior margin, and rounded tips. The disc is slightly wider than it is long. One to five nuchal thorns are placed on the dorsal midline behind the eyes, separated from a continuous row of 21-32 median tail thorns. The tail is moderately long, narrow, and tapering, terminating in a small, low-set caudal fin. The two close-set dorsal fins usually have an interdorsal thorn. Its coloration is grayish purple to dark chocolate brown or black above, occasionally with scattered small, darker spots, and slightly darker below except for a whitish area around the mouth. The anterior tips of the pelvic fins are whitish. Large males have irregular whitish blotches and numerous dark spots, while females have reduced or absent blotches. Juveniles tend to be uniform in color.

The deepsea skate is oviparous. The egg cases are oblong capsules with stiff, pointed horns at the corners, deposited on sandy or muddy flats. One egg case measured 105.8 mm long and 65.2 mm wide. The young may tend to follow large objects, such as their mother. Males mature at 110–120 cm and grow at least as large as 135 cm, while females attain at least 157 cm. The smallest known free-swimming specimens measured 34–36 cm. Deepwater skates feed on benthic organisms, including annelid worms, cephalopods, tanner crabs, shrimps, and bony fishes. Invertebrates comprise a greater proportion of the diet than fishes in juveniles below 1 m.

References

Bathyraja
Taxa named by Charles Henry Gilbert
Fish described in 1896
Taxonomy articles created by Polbot